Mawlana Khâlid Sharazuri also known as Khâlid-i Baghdâdî and Mawlana Khalid (1779–1827) was a Kurdish Sufi, and poet by the name of Shaykh Diya al-Dīn Khalid al-Shahrazuri, the founder of a branch of the Naqshbandi Sufi order - called Khalidi after him - that has had a profound impact not only on his native Kurdish lands but also on many other regions of the western Islamic world. His writings are among the earliest examples of prose and poetry in Central Kurdish.

Shahrazuri acquired the epithet Baghdadi through his frequent stays in Baghdad, for it was in the town of Karadağ (Qaradagh) in the Shahrizur region, about 5 miles from Sulaymaniyah, that he was born in 1779. His father was a Qadiri Sufi who was popularly known as Pir Mika'il Shesh-angosht, and his mother also came from a celebrated Sufi family in Kurdistan.

His best known books are Mecd-i Talid (Big Birth) and Shems'u Shumus (The Sun of All Suns).

Early life
He was born in the year 1779 in the village of Karadağ, near the city of Sulaymaniyah, in what is now Iraqi Kurdistan. His family belonged to the Jaff tribe that claimed descent from the 3rd caliph 'Uthman. Hence, the attribution al-'Uthmani is sometimes added to his name. He was raised and trained in Sulaymaniyah, where there were many schools and many mosques and which was considered the primary educational city of his time. Young Khalid studied with the two great scholars of his time, Shaykh `Abdul Karam al-Barzinji and Shaykh `Abdur Rahim al-Barzinji, and he read with Mullah Muhammad `Ali.

He studied the Qur'an and its explanation and fiqh according to the Shafi`i school. He was famous in poetry. When he was fifteen years of age he took asceticism as his creed, hunger as his horse, wakefulness as his means, seclusion as his friend, and energy as his light. He also studied the sciences of mathematics, philosophy, and logic as well as the principles of jurisprudence. He studied the works of Ibn Hajar, as-Suyuti, and al-Haythami. He memorized the commentary on Qur'an by Baydawi. He was able to find solutions for even the most difficult questions in jurisprudence. He memorized the Qur'an according to the fourteen different ways of recitation, and became very famous everywhere for this.

For many years Mawlana Khalid's interests were focused exclusively on the formal traditions of Islamic learning, and his later, somewhat abrupt, turning to Sufism is highly reminiscent of the patterns in many a classic Sufi biography.

He began his studies in Qaradagh, with Qur'an memorization, Shafi fiqh, and elementary logic. He then traveled to other centers of religious study in Kurdistan, concentrating on logic and kalam. Next he came to Baghdad, where he astounded the established ulema with his learning and bested them in debates on many topics. Such was his mastery of the religious sciences that the governor of Baban proposed him a post as modarres, but he modestly refused. However, when Abd al-Karim Barzanki died of the plague in 1799, Mawlana Khalid assumed the responsibility for the madrasa in Sulaymaniyah he had founded. He remained there for about seven years, distinguished as yet only by his great learning and a high degree of asceticism that caused him to shun the company of secular authority.

He then entered seclusion, leaving everything he had studied behind, engaging in virtuous actions and much dhikr.

Awakening to Sufism
In 1805 Shahrazuri decided to perform hajj, and the journey he undertook as a result turned his aspirations to Sufism. On his way he stopped in Medina for a few days and encountered an anonymous saintly Yemeni, who prophetically warned not to condemn hastily anything he might see in Mecca apparently contradicting the sharia. He traveled to Tihamah and Hijaz through Mosul and Yarbikir and ar-Raha and Aleppo and finally Damascus. There he spent some time, meeting its scholars and studying with the master of both ancient and modern knowledge, scholar of hadith, Shaykh Muhammad al-Kuzbari. He received authorization in the Qadiri Tariqat from Shaykh al-Kuzbari and his deputy, Shaykh Mustafa al-Kurdi, who travelled with him until he reached Medina. Once in Mecca, he went to the Kaaba where he saw a man sitting with his back to the sacred structure and facing him. Forgetting his admonition, he inwardly reproved the man, who asked "do you not know that the worth of the believer is greater in Allah's eyes than the worth of the Kaaba?"  Penitent and overwhelmed, Mawlana Khalid asked for forgiveness and begged the stranger to accept him as a disciple. He refused, telling him that his master awaited him in India.

After the hajj he returned to Solaymaniya and his duties at the madrasa but was inwardly agitated by the desire to find his destined master. Finally, in 1809, an Indian dervish by the name of Mirza Rahim-Allah 'Azimabadi visited Sulaymaniyah. Shaykh Khalid asked him about the perfect guide to show him the way and Shaykh Mirza told him, "There is one perfect Shaykh who observes the character of the Prophet and is a guide in the gnosis (ma`rifah). Come to his service in Jehanabad (India) for he told me before I left, 'You are going to meet someone, bring him back with you.'" He recommended that Mawlana Khalid travel to India and seek initiation from a Naqshbandi sheikh of Delhi, Shah Abdullah Dehlavi. Mawlana Khalid departed immediately.

In India
He reached Delhi in about a year (1809). His journey took him through Rey, Tehran, and other provinces of Iran. He then traveled to the city of Herat in Afghanistan, followed by Kandahar, Kabul, and Peshawar. The great scholars of all these cities with whom he met would often test his knowledge in the sciences of Divine Law (shari'a) and Divine Awareness (ma`rifat), and those of logic, mathematics, and astronomy always found him immensely knowledgeable.

He moved on to Lahore, where he met with Shaykh Thana'ullah an-Naqshbandi and asked for his prayers. He recalled, "I left Lahore, crossing mountains and valleys, forests and deserts until I reached the Sultanate of Delhi known as Jehanabad. It took me one year to reach his city. Forty days before I arrived Shaykh Abdullah ad-Dehlawi told his followers, 'My successor is coming.'"

He was initiated into the Naqshbandi order by Shah Abdullah. In five months he completed all stages of spiritual wayfaring as required by the Naqshbandi's and that in a year he attained the highest degree of sainthood (al-welaya al-kobra). He was then sent back to Sulaymaniyah by Shah Abdullah, will full authority to act as his khalifa in western Asia and to grant initiation not only in the Naqshbandi but also in the Qaderi, Sohrawardi, Kobrawi and Chishti orders.

After enduring hostilities from rival sheikhs in Solaymaniya, he travelled to Baghdad and Damascus where he preached the Naqshbandi way with considerable success. He remained in Damascus for the remainder of his life, appointing Sheikh Ismail Anarani as his chief khalifa before he died in June 1827. He was buried on one of the foothills of Jabal Qasiyun, on the edge of the Turkish quarter of Damascus. Later a building was erected over the tomb, comprising a zawia and a library which are still frequented.

Achievements and legacy
Shahrazuri is credited with establishing the Khalidi, a new branch of the Naqshbandi order. Much of his significance lies in his giving renewed emphasis to traditional tenets and practices of the Naqshbandi, notably adherence to the sharia and sunnah and avoidance of vocal dhikr in preference of silent performance. Some elements of his teachings were controversial, even among other Naqshbandi, foremost being his interpretation of the practice of rabeta - the linking, in the imagination, of the heart of the Murid with that of the preceptor. He proclaimed that rabeta was to be practiced exclusively with reference to himself, even after his death.

Proportionally important for the identity of the Khalidi branch was its political orientation. It was characterised by a pronounced loyalty to the Ottoman state as an object of Muslim unity and cohesion, and a concomitant hostility to the imperialist nations of Europe. Almost everywhere the Khalidiya went, from Daghestan to Sumatra, its members could be identified for their militant attitudes and activities.

The spread of his following was vast, reaching from the Balkans and the Crimea to South East Asia just one generation after his death. His primary following was in the Islamic heartlands - the Arab, Turkish, and Kurdish provinces of the Ottoman Empire and the Kurdish areas of Iran. Nearly everywhere in Anatolia the Khalidi branch of the Naqshbandi came to supersede branches of senior origin.

Shahrazuri had a pronounced impact on the religious life of his native Kurdistan. For the Kurds, Islamic practice was traditionally connected with membership in a Sufi brotherhood, and the Qaderi order had predominated in most Kurdish areas. With the emergence of the Khalidiya, the Qadiriyyah lost their preeminence to the Naqshbandi. Kurdish identity became associated with the Khalidi branch of the Naqshbandi, and this, coupled with the hereditary nature of leadership of the order in Kurdistan, accounts for the prominence of various Naqshbandi families in Kurdistan to the present.

His place in the Khalidiyya Golden Chain

See also
List of famous Sufis
List of Kurdish people

References

Sources
 Classical Islam and the Naqshbandi Sufi Tradition, Shaykh Muhammad Hisham Kabbani, Islamic Supreme Council of America (June 2004), .
E.F. Haydari, Al-Majd al-taled fi manaqeb al-sheikh Khalid, Istanbul 1874
S. M. Stern, Islamic Philosophy & the Classical Tradition, Oxford 1972
Hamid Algar, The Naqshbandi Order, Studia Islamica 1976

External links
Khalid al-Baghdadi (Naqshbandi-Haqqani Sufi Order website)
Belief and Islam Turkish translation by Khalid al-Baghdadi
Belief and Islam- by Mawlana Khalid-i Baghdadi

1779 births
1827 deaths
Naqshbandi order
Sufi mystics
People from Baghdad
Kurdish people from the Ottoman Empire
Kurdish scholars
Kurdish philosophers
18th-century Kurdish people
Iranian Muslim mystics